The 1899 Lafayette football team represented Lafayette College in the 1899 college football season. Lafayette shut out 10 opponents and finished with a 12–1 record in their first year under head coach Samuel B. Newton. Significant games included victories over Penn (6–0), Lehigh (17–0 and 35–0), and Cornell (6–5), and its sole loss coming against co-national champion Princeton (0–12).  The 1899 Lafayette team outscored its opponents by a combined total of 253 to 23.

Two Lafayette players received recognition on the 1899 College Football All-America Team. They are: fullback Edward G. Bray (Outing magazine, 2nd team; Charles E. Patterson, 1st team); and guard H. E. Trout (Walter Camp, 3rd team).

Schedule

Players
The following players were regulars on the 1899 Lafayette football team.

Backs
 Edward G. "Ned" Bray - fullback, 5 feet, 11 inches, 174 pounds
 Walter Hubley - quarterback, 5 feet, 8 inches, 155 pounds
 Ross G. Knight - left halfback, 5 feet, 11 inches, 160 pounds
 J. E. Platt - right halfback, 5 feet, 9 inches, 167 pounds

Linemen
 Charles Schmidt - right guard, 5 feet, 10 inches, 182 pounds
 Ned Ely - left end, 6 feet, 170 pounds
 John Chalmers - left tackle and captain, 5 feet, 11 inches, 170 pounds
 W. E. Bachman - center, 6 feet, 191 pounds
 D. R. Brown - right end, 6 feet, 172 pounds
 Joe Wiedenmayer - right tackle, 6 feet, 177 pounds
 H. E. Trout - left guard, 5 feet, 11 inches, 190 pounds
 L. P. Butler - guard
 R. A. Freed - tackle

References

Lafayette
Lafayette Leopards football seasons
Lafayette football